(born 1950) is a Japanese organic chemist. He is a university lecturer in the Applied Chemistry Department of Tokyo University of Science.

Soai studied at the University of Tokyo, where he received his Ph.D. in 1979 in organic synthesis under Teruaki Mukaiyama and was a fellow of the Japan Society for the Promotion of Science. He conducted his postdoctoral studies with Ernest L. Eliel at the University of North Carolina. In 1981, he became a lecturer at Tokyo University of Science, and was promoted to associate professor (1986) and full professor (1991). 

He is involved in asymmetric and enantioselective synthesis, asymmetric autocatalysis, origin of chirality, 
The Soai reaction for alkylation of pyrimidine-5-carbaldehyde with diisopropylzinc is named after him.

Soai was a visiting professor to many universities such as the ESPCI Paris (2001), Kyushu University (2005), Waseda University (2007-2010), University of Strasbourg (2008), and Jilin University (2010-2015).

Honors
 Inoue Prize (2000)
 Chirality Medal (2005)
 Honorary member of the Italian National Academy of Sciences (2006)
 Science and Technology Prize from MEXT, the Japanese Ministry of Education, Culture, Sports, Science and Technology (2007)
 Chemical Society of Japan Award (2010)
 Japanese Purple Ribbon Medal (2012)
 Doctor Honoris Causa, University of Pannonia, Hungary, 2015

References

1950 births
Living people
Japanese chemists
Stereochemists